Bliss (now Old Bliss) is an unincorporated community near Marland in Noble County, Oklahoma. Bliss was one of the 101 Ranch towns. The post office opened November 4, 1894, but was moved to Marland April 8, 1922.

Sources
Shirk, George H.; Oklahoma Place Names; University of Oklahoma Press; Norman, Oklahoma; 1987:  .

Unincorporated communities in Noble County, Oklahoma
Unincorporated communities in Oklahoma